Sins of Sinister is a 2023 comic book crossover storyline published in the X-Men franchise of books by Marvel Comics. The event involves a dark future brought about by Mister Sinister's corrupt machinations.

Sins of Sinister will kick-off with a one-shot written by Kieron Gillen and artist Lucas Werneck. Immortal X-Men by Kieron Gillen, X-Men Red by Al Ewing and Legion of X by Si Spurrier will be transformed into three limited series: Immoral X-Men, Storm & the Brotherhood of Mutants and Nightcrawlers. The story will be told across three different time periods: 10 years, 100 years and 1000 years in the future. The series' writers will continue their current story plans after the finale one-shot, Sins of Sinister: Dominion.

Publication history
In August 2022, Marvel comics posted a teaser "S.O.S." for the next big X-Men crossover. A later teaser revealed the crossover's official name, Sins of Sinister, and the involvement of Mister Sinister. In the Next Big Thing panel at the New York Comic-Con in October 2022, the X-Men epic is officially announced after months of teases. “Sinister's lurked around, being sinister for all the Krakoan Age. Eventually, he was going to make a play. This is it, and it's bigger than you can imagine, stretching across 1000 years of nightmares,” Gillen explained.

Sinister's machinations will create a horrifying timeline that will extend into several other spin-off limited series, each running for three issues. In Storm & the Brotherhood of Mutants from writer Ewing, Storm leads a new Brotherhood of Arakko across the wrecked landscape of Mars. Nightcrawlers from writer Spurrier features Sinister's private army of chimera assassins. And in Immoral X-Men from writer Gillen, the X-Men are sworn to crush a world that adores and respects them.

During the Professing X: An X-Men Panel in the Thought Bubble comic art festival, the writers talked about the upcoming event and showed off the designs of new characters appearing in the dark future including Wagnerine (chimera of Nightcrawler and Wolverine), a new Captain America whose DNA is mixed with those of Mister Sinister, Xible (a future version of Cable merged with the Arakki Xilo), Rasputin from Hickman's Powers of X, Auntie Fortune (chimera of Nightcrawler and Domino) and Ironfire.

Main characters

Plot

Prelude
The Quiet Council is meeting and Kitty Pryde is narrating. "Everything was just... normal", or as normal as things could be after Judgment Day. Xavier won't discuss Erik, Kurt has his horns. They're discussing the state of things after the war with the Eternals. Storm says the Arakkii are hurt but proud and satisfied with the spoils of victory. The treaty with the Eternals, the alliance, reparations, and the Keys to Uranos for an hour. Magneto's death seems to have convinced them of the Krakoan's sincerity and there's a better understanding between the two.

Orchis being hailed as heroes is a problem. For the most part, Kitty reflects on how everything else is settled and everyone is happy except for Exodus who isn't a fan of sharing the resurrection protocols with humans. Kitty gives a speech of how it's great that Jean Grey is running the Phoenix Foundation, how it's ethically a great thing to help children in dire need, and it's good optics for those without a heart. Exodus remains unimpressed.

As Kitty thinks the Quiet Council can work Sinister enters. Emma brings up their remaining order of business involving Doctor Stasis. But before they can start, Destiny tells Exodus that Sinister is about to kill Hope. Sinister, pulling out a gun, "Wha..? You spoilsport!" Exodus explodes half of Sinister's body off and Hope punches what's left. Kitty quotes "What's going on?"

 Moira VI.1 death - Destiny is messing with Sinister for not being judged by the Celestial. Sinister returns to his lair and posits that he only has about 10 chances to kill the Council. He orders his subordinates to watch the feeds and if the feeds or his life signals are cut for five seconds, they are to activate the Moira VI fail-safe and kill the timeline. A data page of the Quiet Council seating chart is shown with Sinister ranking each member by kill priority. Attempt 1 resulted in his own death. He makes 8 more attempts. Sinister sets off a bomb at the Quiet Council chambers, but Destiny warned everyone so they weren't there. They find Sinister, Exodus exploding him again.

 Moira VI.2 death - Sinister enters the chambers and Mystique jumps him into a chokehold. Destiny tells the group he's going to kill her and Hope. Hope borrows Exodus' powers and explodes Sinister.

 Moira IV.3 death - Sinister tries several times, in some instances succeeding in killing some of them before he's stopped and killed. He comes in with battle suits, is fried by Storm, fried by Hope borrowing Storm's powers. One battle suit fritzes out and he kills himself.

Sinister has Dark Beast's head kept alive in a tube. When Sinister asks for his advice, Dark Beast demands to be released. Sinister quotes "Nope, Dark Beast. You'd be sad if you came out anyway. You're not even the darkest Beast anymore." He has one last attempt remaining and then he'll be forced to return to Moira V meaning doing Judgment Day all over again.

 Attempt #10 -The Quiet Council is celebrating and having some drinks. Storm flies off as there are some mercenaries to deal with on Arakko. Sinister enters and says he's been accused by a psychic imprint from Scott and wants the telepaths to prove his innocence. They agree and he offers them a vision. But the vision is a cluster of Xavier brains he has cloned and turned into a psychic bomb. Destiny warns them to disconnect but it's too late. The cloned brains give one command: "TK pulse, torso height." Most of the members dive for cover, but Emma Frost and Xavier are killed. Exodus and Hope remain because they are indestructible but still in the telepathic trance. Sinister places a communion wafer, mixed with Gambit and Harry Leland's powers, into Exodus' mouth and his head explodes. He's out. No longer mimicking his powers, Hope is no longer indestructible. Sinister shoots her with hollow bullets embedded with Unus the Untouchables' genes, generating force fields inside Hope that expands and kills her. Sinister disappears leaving the others in chaos.

The protocols are in danger now. Colossus mentions the contingencies and that though they're not tested, they could work. They need to bring Hope back. Destiny says she can find him and Kitty says, "Good. Then let's go dig this bastard out of whatever hole he's hiding in.

Sinister is in his lab after fleeing from his attack on the Quiet Council where he killed Hope, Exodus, Emma, and Xavier. He orders the machine to give him Moira VII and to quickly Velocidad the hell out of it because he needs a save point and to get out of there. He had hoped to kill more Quiet Council's members but says, "yes, I could work with this." He doesn't need anyone else, Sebastian Shaw can be played and Storm will be a problem but he'll handle it. He doesn't want to repeat Judgment Day. Moira VII is ready and he says, "Oh, I really hope this works... I really could do without being trapped helplessly in the Pit forever."

X-Force and Cable are surveying the damage and looking over the killed. Cable carries Hope outside where the citizens of Krakoa have gathered. They throw their fists in the air in solidarity as Cable descends the steps holding his daughter, the rest of the Five silently crying.

Xavier thinks people should be suspicious of him, that it's one of the ways he's been protecting others. He says his dream is intangible, that he created the X-Men to ensure there was a world where the dream - any dream - could come true. "Sworn to protect a world that hates and fears them. But protect it from whom?"

Important top secret data page written by Beast about resurrection redundancy. It goes over the 3 points to the protocol process:
 He says they presently need Sinister's DNA database however for every mutant they return, they gain a fresh source of DNA. Eventually they won't need Sinister anymore and be indebted to him. "The day can't come soon enough."
 Cerebro can be replaced if ever destroyed, and there are other telepaths who can take Xavier's place, as we know.
 The Five is the biggest problem. Although the death of Egg, Proteus, Elixir, or Tempus would be significant losses, their powers can be reliably duplicated by Mimic or Synch. Hope, however, is different. She is required to synergize the process and apparently attempts to perform resurrections without her have been disastrous. She is the X-Factor and they're unsure if another X-Gene can duplicate the X-Factor.

The remaining Five, Cable, the Stepford Cuckoos, Doctor Nemesis, Mimic, and Synch are meeting. Mimic immediately says he can't do the job, it's too horrible and it's too much pressure. Synch says he'll do it. Nemesis says he doesn't see to see Hope's deceased body but Synch wants to as it will make him feel closer to her. He's saddened when he sees her and says they have to bring her back. His aura lights up.

It works and Hope bursts through the egg! Someone announces "Hope's Alive!" to the crowd outside, fists pump the air across the land. She asks what happened and Synch replies "Sinister" as Exodus, Xavier, and Emma are also brought back. Crawling out of his egg, Xavier says that the Quiet Council is leading the X-Men to him. Exodus and Emma want revenge.

Destiny has led the group to Alaska where Sinister once had a secret underground city. It's an powerful group, a mix of the council, the X-Men, Rogue, Wolverine II, and Angel. Cyclops says the X-Men will take the lead and wants Nightcrawler with them. They stand at the edge of and look down a crater to see the city is indeed functioning again, steam rising from factories and what not. Inside, Sinister's computer announces "Shaw batteries 94% charged." As the X-Men descend into the city Sinister deploys a bunch of Eye-Boy/Cyclops Chimeras. They're gross and firing optic blasts all over the place.

One-eyed birds start attacking the X-Men, firing optic blasts as well. Cyclops says things have escalated and calls the council in for support. Shaw is like "At last." He, Destiny, Mystique, Storm, Kitty,  and Colossus join the fight. Storm strikes down several of the birds at once, Kate slashes them with her sword, Colossus crushes them in his hands. Sinister deploys Wolverine Chimeras with claws sticking out all over their bodies.

Jean telepathically finds Sinister and immediately alerts Nightcrawler. "On it!" he says as he bamfs off. He appears in front of a brain in a jar. It was a damn decoy.

"Shaw batteries 98% charged" says Sinister's computer. He deploys a bunch of Proteus clones with Wolverine claws next. I swear this is like an event in and of itself. It looks like Magik is killed in the chaos.

"Shaw batteries 100% charged, ready for launch." Sinister boards a jet with a huge red diamond on it. He's so vain. Sinister is ranting about how Krakoa wasn't made by the X-Men but by him, Xavier, Moira MacTaggert, Magneto, and Apocalypse. How they take what they want from him but then want to cast him out when he turns their stomach. They should be saying a prayer to Mister Sinister every time they cheat death! He's about to escape in his jet when Exodus, Hope, Xavier, and Emma are waiting for him. Exodus and Hope hold hands and Exodus TK tears the jet in half, bringing it down, protecting his group in a Telekinetic bubble as it explodes. Sinister and his crew crawl out of the wreckage.

As these events happen, Xavier comments about how he formed the first X-Men team and how that team slowly expanded. He also admits that he has tremendous power, and if given several years, he could kill everyone. 

Cable is perp-walking Sinister through the crowd as they throw things at him, booing and yelling and calling for blood. Cable brings him to the center of the Quiet Council and tosses him to the ground. Emma joins Cable in the center. Xavier raises his hand and Krakoa's vines start grabbing him, wrapping themselves around him. Sinister is pulled down into the Pit of Exile and is gone. Xavier says this is a wake-up call, that they must be better in the future and cannot act as they have. A useful monster is still a monster. With Sinister gone, he says let us make a better, kinder Krakoa. Kurt responds with "At last." Hope and Exodus look at each other as they walk away with Emma and Xavier.

Off to the side, Destiny grabs Mystique's arm and says "My love. We must leave. Immediately."

Alone, Xavier peered out from his balcony. He enters his bedroom and approaches a mirror, removing his Cerebro helmet revealing at the center of his forehead a Sinister’s iconic red diamond! He remarks that everyone should wake up every morning and be grateful that his power and skill is not in the hands of someone who is even slightly worse than he is.

Part 1

+10 years
Sinister is in The Hatchery as several bodies emerge from eggs. "To me, my me's" he says with a smirk.

+0 years
Sinister is screaming as he's being pulled down into the Pit, with Xavier, Emma, Exodus, and Hope standing over him. Then, he's gone. Xavier says having a monster among them was a mistake, and that this has to be a new age for Krakoa.

Later, Xavier is looking in the mirror as Emma approaches him, asking what he's doing. He's admiring himself and feels so free as he lets his red diamond be revealed. Emma joins him and reveals her red diamond but says they must keep it "oh, so hush-hush." Exodus and Hope approach, also unveiling red diamonds, with Hope saying they need to stay camouflaged for now until they pull the trigger. "And then it's headshots for the whole #@&*! planet." Exodus says, "One step at a time, my messiah. First tomorrow... let's put on a good show."

The Quiet Council is meeting and Xavier is speaking, saying with Sinister finally gone they must reconsider their program. Nightcrawler mentions that "Mother and Irene" have disappeared and the council is looking sparse. Xavier says he suspects they left because they grasp the nature of the new age. There's no room for unreformed villains. He says they will fill the seats soon enough, but that they need to share more with the humans, including working towards total access to immortality. Emma pretends to be against this (putting on a show), saying they need to bring the Genoshans back first. Xavier says they will, but they need not rush, as it's more important to ensure they actually have the time to bring them back. They need humanity invested in Krakoa's success. By offering them resurrection access, they'll be significantly invested. Exodus pretends to be against this, Hope says "Really? Even if I thought it was a damn good idea?" Exodus agrees to hear from the rest of the council.

Storm sees the wisdom in the idea, but wonders if they can actually manage it. Kate agrees, saying they would have to figure out how to increase the resurrection rate and find a way to harvest everyone's brain patterns. Xavier suggests that Forge can pick up where Sinister left off regarding the DNA, and Emma says the Cuckoos can handle the extra psychic workload of taking human imprints. Though the Cuckoos will likely be resistant to such a job, Emma is confident she and Xavier can convince them.

+1 year
Journalist Ben Urich is walking through what looks like Times Square, billboards above flashing "X-Mas". The hyphen is a diamond. He enters J. Jonah Jameson's office, thanking Jameson for meeting with him in secrecy. Jameson says Ben is looking kinda rough, unshaven and what not. Ben opens up a small briefcase and pulls out what looks like an injection gun with a needle on the end and a green liquid inside. He grabs Jameson's arm and pokes him with it. He checks the results and is relieved that Jameson hasn't been compromised. Ben then reveals to Jameson that the mutants have offered a limited X-Gene to humanity which is a Trojan Horse. He has found out through his investigations that if someone has the gene they can be taken over at any time. The gene also pushes people's worst impulses. Countless people including politicians have taken it. Ben says he has evidence of this, and that even without the X-gene, Krakoan telepaths are at work. They're taking over the world with smiles on their faces. Jameson says he's shocked... shocked to think Ben believed that the test gun would actually reveal the tampering. Jameson's red diamond is now visible. The test was released to lure out the paranoid-yet-correct people like Ben who were suspicious. A group of thugs enter and drag Ben away.

Forge is tinkering with a machine, a weapon, as Emma, Xavier, Exodus and Hope watch. Emma asks "what's the deniability like? Can this be traced to us?" Forge says no in his arrogant way, his red diamond showing. He says once they pull the trigger of this weapon, Krakoa will be reduced to a drooling vegetable. Emma says they'll also take the opportunity to take Doug out, that she'll prompt Beast when it's time. Forge asks who would like to kill Krakoa. Hope is more than excited to do it to headshot a whole island from orbit. She presses the button and Krakoa is zapped. Alone in the Quiet Council Chamber, Doug tries communicating with Krakoa but it's not responding. Wolverine sneaks up and murders Doug, stabbing him from behind, claws coming out of his chest.

Emma broadcasts a psychic message out to the world, telling them that Orchis has attacked Krakoa with a huge EMC attack. That it has killed the living island and wiped the banks of all the psychic imprints. She says that though the mutants have a mystical method to bring back their own called the Waiting Room, they can no longer resurrect humans. She announces to the world that they will be acting against Orchis immediately.

The Avengers (consisting of Captain America, Captain Marvel, Iron Man, Nighthawk, and Thor, the Fantastic Four (consisting of Mister Fantastic, Invisible Woman, Human Torch, and Thing), and some X-Men (Storm, Jean, Exodus, Cyclops) attack the Orchis Forge and destroy it. Mister Fantastic, Iron Man, and Forge worked together to create a virus to kill Nimrod and it works (it looks like Moira gets away). Captain America tells Cyclops that he wishes humanity had seen Orchis as the danger they really were earlier. Cyclops says maybe this disaster will encourage more people to take the X-gene. In fact, he considers the Avengers honorary X-Men now. He suggests that Cap take the gene. "Captain America... mutant." Caps agrees.

Forge tinkers with the now drooling Krakoa and releases Sinister from the Pit of Exile. Xavier informs him that Krakoa is dead and the Earth is compromised. Sinister is delighted to say the least and he's excited to watch the show closer up. He teleports away to his base under Muir Island. Recording himself, we learn that he buried a copy of himself "and some extra spice", in every DNA sample. Despite their best geneticists going over the samples, Krakoa's mutants were unable to detect it. Every time someone died, they would be compromised. It was a perfect plan except it didn't work. The problem was Hope. Her participation in the resurrections somehow fixed his meddling so he had to compromise her by killing her, along with a critical mass of other council members to carry out his plans while he was in the Pit. He says the X-Men have beaten him so many times but now they are mine. That they are him now. He commences his 5-year plan and this is where things move fast as Sinister is essentially taking adversaries off the board.

Precogs learn that Thanos will be attacking Earth again so Hope borrows Domino's power and using a miniaturized Juggernaut (by an application of Micromax) as a bullet, shot through Thanos' forehead via a Forge-crafted temporal canon, leaving his brain matter scattered through two billion years of history. Thanos is killed but Juggernaut is lost forever.

Doctor Doom attempts to recruit Namor to form a resistance against Krakoa, but Namor is already compromised and kills him. Doom is replaced by a clone who is under mutant control. However, a sole Doombot claiming the mantle of Doctor Doom has been reportedly sighted working with the few remaining Orchis cells.

Due to fake rumors of another Eternal attack, Krakoa and Arakko go to war with the Eternals. The Arakkii release Uranos who destroys his own people and place them back into their own resurrection process. However, the X-Men by this point had found a way to counter it. They imprison their personalities within stasis on a space station far away from the Earth.

Considering Reed Richards too dangerous to be left alive, but rather than risk corrupting his mind for himself, Sinister takes comfort in tricking the Thing into accepting a voluntary X-Gene, placing him under his control. As a sleeper agent, the Thing is able to wait until the right moment to attack the team while they're lost in a cosmic storm in deep space. The compromised Thing ends up spreading a lethal version of his rocky skin to his teammates while strangling Reed as their ship is lost forever. 

With most of the human members of the Avengers compromised, they start going crazy and partake in increasingly extreme and malevolent actions. This climaxes in a war after Captain America takes over the US government after killing the President of the United States. The X-Men defeat the Avengers and the mutants are hailed as Earth's mightiest heroes.

+5 years
The Quiet Council is meeting and Storm has a matter she needs to broach. Beast, Namor, and Magik have filled the empty seats. Storm is becoming increasingly disillusioned with their work. Though there is bright light in what they're doing, the shadows it casts are dark. Xavier asks her to be specific and she says they would be there all day if she went down the list of questionable omens. One of which is that she heard all the Spirits of Vengeance have left the Earth. The Arakkii mystics say they are petrified. But she wants to concentrate on one thing at the moment, pointing to Kurt and saying he's an imposter! "WHERE IS KURT? WHERE IS MY FRIEND?!"

Storm is surprised to see Sinister appear with the real Nightcrawler in his beastly form on a leash. Sinister mentions that he's unable to mess with Kurt's genes thus far. Storm grows angry, saying Sinister should be in the Pit, that this is an abomination. Sinister says, "Yeah, you got me. Or rather... you've got us." The council stands, staring at Ororo who is in the middle. Sinister says that Ororo has always made things hard. That deleting herself from the resurrection protocols meant they couldn't just kill her and compromise her. He says psychic meddling is risky but Ororo leaves them no other option, but his attempt to psychically control her with Xavier and Emma doesn't work, as Storm's had her own psychic defenses safeguarded by Lactuca which prove powerful enough to give her a chance to escape the island. 

Reaching Peru, Ororo finds Mystique and Destiny waiting for her. Destiny claims that they will lose unless... they must be on the same side. With Ororo gone, Sinister says he should take her seat at the Council. Everyone agrees.

Shaw becomes Krakoa's emissary to the various Hell realms. This allows Krakoa to make a deal with Muspelhelm that allows Magik to borrow "a certain sword" that she uses to propel Asgard (where Thor has fled) far away from Midgard. "No more Wanda. Just in case." The Scarlet Witch is assassinated to prevent her from undoing Sinister's work. 

The Westchester school becomes a Sinister Factory. The first generation of Chimeras come to be, splicing two X-Genes into one body like a Beast/Colossus Chimera, a Cyclops/Wolverine Chimera, an Iceman/Sunfire Chimera, and a Shadowcat/Angel Chimera. The waste and pollution created by the process will soon tumble life expectancy across the eastern seaboard.

With rumors of Storm to be hiding on Arakko, the planet is eventually targeted and destroyed with a Legion clone being inserted into the core of Mars, but Storm's fate is left unknown. 

On Earth, Sinister is walking through Times Square, a WANTED image of Storm plastered on the various screens. He observes a man at one of the X-Gene clinics, trying to warn the crowd that the Westchester lab is poisoning the world. He continues to observe as the crowd move in to attack the well-meaning man, who is grabbed by a Wall-Crawler (a hybrid of Nightcrawler and Spider-Man) belonging to the Night Legion and taken away. Sinister is pleased.

During another Quiet Council meeting, Xavier announces that their hold on the world is such that they no longer need to hide their red diamonds. Emma says diamonds are always in fashion. Hope brings up a few problems: what's left of Orchis is still out there, agitating. The attack on Mars didn't get Storm. And she's heard from Cable that the rest of space is all riled up. She says the grand empires of the galaxy will be coming for them sooner or later, unless they "tool up" and go to them first. 

Sinister says not to worry about that, that they should focus all of their efforts into science. Emma wants to vote on it and hands go up when she asks who wants to prepare for a little space war. Sinister is starting to realize that his creations are starting to go rogue. He also noticed that they've been meddling with his work apparently. They appear to have their own ambitions and desires, but Xavier says they can all work together. Sinister pretends to be fine with this and walks out. But he's thinking he gave them too long of a leash. Sinister decides it's time to reset the timeline before pissed-off aliens attack the planet. He tries to teleport to his secret lab, but the teleporter won't work. He's forced to enter physically, moving through various security measures he himself created. When Sinister finally reaches the lab, he discovers that someone stole it, trapping him in this reality.

Storm & the Brotherhood of Mutants

Nightcrawlers

Immoral X-Men

Issues involved

Prelude issues

Main series

Reception

References

2023 in comics
X-Men storylines